The Porto Open was a women's professional tennis tournament held in Porto, Portugal. It was played on outdoor clay courts and was classed as a Tier IV event on the Women's Tennis Association (WTA) Tour. It was held for two years (2001–2002), and had a total prize fund of $140,000 in each year. The most notable player to win the singles was three-time French Open champion Arantxa Sánchez Vicario, who won the inaugural event.

Past finals

Singles

Doubles

References
 ITF Search (search Oporto)

 
Clay court tennis tournaments
WTA Tour
Recurring sporting events established in 2001
Recurring sporting events disestablished in 2002
2001 establishments in Portugal
2002 disestablishments in Portugal
Tennis tournaments in Portugal